Schenectady  is a city in Schenectady County, New York, United States, of which it is the county seat. As of the 2020 census, the city's population of 67,047 made it the state's ninth-largest city by population. The city is in eastern New York, near the confluence of the Mohawk and Hudson rivers.

Schenectady was founded on the south side of the Mohawk River by Dutch colonists in the 17th century, many of whom came from the Albany area. The name "Schenectady" is derived from the Mohawk word skahnéhtati, meaning "beyond the pines" and used for the area around Albany, New York.  Residents of the new village developed farms on strip plots along the river. Connected to the west by the Mohawk River and Erie Canal, Schenectady developed rapidly in the 19th century as part of the Mohawk Valley trade, manufacturing, and transportation corridor. By 1824, more people worked in manufacturing than agriculture or trade; like many New York cities, it had a cotton mill that processed cotton from the Deep South. In the 19th century, nationally influential companies and industries developed in Schenectady, including General Electric and American Locomotive Company (ALCO), which were powers into the mid-20th century. Schenectady was part of emerging technologies, with GE collaborating in the production of nuclear-powered submarines and, in the 21st century, working on other forms of renewable energy.

History
When first encountered by Europeans, the Mohawk Valley was the territory of the Mohawk nation, one of the Five Nations of the Iroquois Confederacy, or Haudenosaunee. They had occupied territory in the region since at least 1100 AD. Starting in the early 1600s the Mohawk moved their settlements closer to the river and by 1629, they had also taken over territories on the Hudson River's west bank that were formerly held by the Algonquian-speaking Mahican people.

In the 1640s, the Mohawk had three major villages, all on the Mohawk River's south side. The easternmost one was Ossernenon, about 9 miles west of present-day Auriesville, New York. When Dutch settlers developed Fort Orange (present-day Albany, New York) in the Hudson Valley beginning in 1614, the Mohawk called their settlement skahnéhtati, meaning "beyond the pines," referring to a large area of pine barrens between the Mohawk settlements and the Hudson River. About 3,200 acres of this unique ecosystem are now protected as the Albany Pine Bush. Eventually, this word entered the lexicon of the Dutch settlers. The settlers in Fort Orange used skahnéhtati to refer to the new village at the Mohawk flats (see below), which became known as Schenectady (with a variety of spellings).

In 1661, Arendt van Corlaer, (later Van Curler), a Dutch immigrant, bought a large piece of land on the Mohawk River's south side. The Colonial government gave other colonists grants of land in this portion of the flat fertile river valley, as part of New Netherland. The settlers recognized the Mohawk had cultivated these bottomlands for maize by the Mohawk for centuries. Van Curler took the largest piece of land; the remainder was divided into 50-acre plots for the other first fourteen proprietors; Alexander Lindsey Glen, Philip Hendrickse Brouwer, Simon Volkertse Veeder, Pieter Adrianne Van Wogglelum, Teunize Cornelise Swart, Bastia De Winter atty for Catalyn De Vos, Gerrit Bancker, William Teller, Pieter Jacobse Borsboom, Pieter Danielle Van Olinda, Jan Barentse Wemp(le), Jacques Cornelize Van Slyck, Marten Cornelize Van Esselstyn, and Harmen Albertse Vedder.  As most early colonists were from the Fort Orange area, they may have anticipated working as fur traders, but the Beverwijck (later Albany) traders kept a monopoly of legal control. The settlers here turned to farming. Their 50-acre lots were unique for the colony, "laid out in strips along the Mohawk River", with the narrow edges fronting the river, as in French colonial style. They relied on rearing livestock and wheat. The proprietors and their descendants controlled all the land of the town for generations, essentially acting as government until after the Revolutionary War, when representative government was established.

Beginning from the first decades of European colonization, Dutch colonists formed relationships with Mohawk women, though these did not usually result in marriage. Their children were raised within Mohawk communities, as the tribe had a matrilineal kinship system, and these multiracial offspring were considered to be born into the mother's clan. During the colonial era, the fur trade formed one of the important trading relationships between Indians and colonists. In response to labor  shortages among Dutch colonists, enslaved Africans were imported to work on farmsteads in Schenectady.

Some Euro-Indian descendants, such as Jacques Cornelissen Van Slyck and his sister Hilletie van Olinda, who were of Dutch, French and Mohawk ancestry, became interpreters and intermarried with Dutch colonists. They also gained land in the Schenectady settlement. They were among the few métis who seemed to move from Mohawk to Dutch society, as they were described as "former Indians", although they did not always have an easy time of it. In 1661 Jacques inherited what became known as Van Slyck's Island from his brother Marten, who had been given it by the Mohawk. Van Slyck family descendants retained ownership through the 19th century.

In 1664, an English fleet conquered the colony of New Netherland and renamed it New York. They confirmed the monopoly on the fur trade by Albany, and issued orders to prohibit Schenectady from the trade through 1670 and later. Settlers purchased additional land from the Mohawk in 1670 and 1672. (Jacques and Hilletie Van Slyck each received portions of land in the Mohawk 1672 deed for Schenectady.) Twenty years later (1684) Governor Thomas Dongan granted letters patent for Schenectady to five additional trustees.

On February 8, 1690, during King William's War, French forces and their Indian allies, mostly Ojibwe and Algonquin warriors, attacked Schenectady by surprise, leaving 62 dead, 11 of them enslaved Africans. American history notes it as the Schenectady massacre. A total of 27 persons were taken captive, including five enslaved Africans; the raiders took their captives overland about 200 miles to Montreal and its associated Mohawk mission village of Kahnawake. Typically the younger captives were adopted by Mohawk families to replace people who had died. Through the early 18th century in the raiding between Quebec and the northern British colonies, some captives were ransomed by their communities. Colonial governments got involved only for high-ranking officers or other officials. In 1748, during King George's War, the French and Indians attacked Schenectady again, killing 70 residents.

In 1765, Schenectady was incorporated as a borough. During the American Revolutionary War the local militia unit, the 2nd Albany County Militia Regiment, fought in the Battle of Saratoga and against Loyalist troops. Most of the wars in the Mohawk Valley were fought further west on the frontier in the areas of the German Palatine settlement which was west of Little Falls. Because of their close business and other relationships with the British, some settlers from the city were Loyalists and moved to Canada in the late stages of the Revolution. The Crown granted them land in what became known as Upper Canada and later Ontario.

New Republic
It was not until after the Revolutionary War that the village residents reduced the power of the descendants of the early trustees and gained representative government.  The settlement was chartered as a city in 1798. Long interested in supporting higher education and morals, the members of the city's three oldest churches—the Dutch First Reformed Church, St. Georges Episcopal Church, and First Presbyterian Church—formed a "union" and founded Union College in 1795 under a charter from the state. The school had started in 1785 as Schenectady Academy. This founding was part of the expansion of higher education in upstate New York in the postwar years.

During this period, migrants poured into upstate and western New York from New England, but there were also new immigrants from England and Europe. Many traveled west along the Mohawk River, settling in the western part of the state, where they developed more agriculture on former Iroquois lands. A dairy industry developed in the central part of the state. New settlers were predominantly of English and Scotch-Irish descent. In 1819, Schenectady suffered a fire that destroyed more than 170 buildings and most of its historic, distinctive Dutch-style architecture.

New York had passed a law for gradual abolition of slavery in 1799, however in 1824 there were still a total of 102 slaves in Schenectady County with nearly half residing in the city. That year the city of Schenectady had a total population of 3939, which included 240 free blacks, 47 slaves, and 91 foreigners.

In the 19th century, after completion of the Erie Canal in 1825, Schenectady became an important transportation, manufacturing and trade center. By 1824 more of its population worked in manufacturing than agriculture or trade. Among the industries was a cotton mill, which processed cotton from the Deep South. It was one of many such mills in upstate whose products were part of the exports shipped out of New York City. The city and state had many economic ties to the South at the same time that some residents became active in the abolitionist movement.

Schenectady benefited by increased traffic connecting the Hudson River to the Mohawk Valley and the Great Lakes to the west and New York City to the south. The Albany and Schenectady Turnpike (now State Street) was constructed in 1797 to connect Albany to settlements in the Mohawk Valley. The Mohawk and Hudson Railroad started operations in 1831 as one of the first railway lines in the United States, connecting the city and Albany by a route through the pine barrens between them. Developers in Schenectady quickly founded the Utica & Schenectady Railroad, chartered in 1833; Schenectady & Susquehanna Railroad, chartered May 5, 1836; and Schenectady & Troy Railroad, chartered in 1836, making Schenectady "the rail hub of America at the time" and competing with the Erie Canal. Commodities from the Great Lakes areas and commercial products were shipped to the East and New York City through the Mohawk Valley and Schenectady.

The last slaves in New York and Schenectady gained freedom in 1827, under the state's gradual abolition law. The law first gave freedom to children born to slave mothers, but they were indentured to the mother's master for a period into their early 20s. Union College established a school for black children in 1805, but discontinued it two years later. Methodists helped educate the children for a time but public schools did not accept them.

In the 1830s, the abolitionist movement grew in Schenectady. In 1836, Rev. Isaac Groot Duryee (also recorded as Duryea) co-founded the interracial Anti-Slavery Society at Union College and the Anti-Slavery Society of Schenectady in 1837. Freedom seekers were supported via the Underground Railroad route that ran through the area, passing to the west and north to Canada, which had abolished slavery.

In 1837 Duryee, together with others who were free people of color, co-founded the First Free Church of Schenectady (now the Duryee Memorial AME Zion Church). He also started a school for students of color. The abolitionist Theodore S. Wright, an African-American minister based in New York City, spoke at the church's dedication and praised the school.

Through the late 19th century, new industries were established in the Mohawk Valley and powered by the river. Industrial jobs attracted many new immigrants, first from Ireland, and later in the century from Italy and Poland. In 1887, Thomas Edison moved his Edison Machine Works to Schenectady. In 1892, Schenectady became the headquarters of the General Electric Company. This business became a major industrial and economic force and helped establish the city and region as a national manufacturing center. GE became important nationally as a creative company, expanding into many different fields. American Locomotive Company also developed here, from a Schenectady company, and merging several smaller companies in 1901; it was second in the United States in the manufacture of steam locomotives before developing diesel technology.

20th century to present
Like other industrial cities in the Mohawk Valley, in the early 20th century, Schenectady attracted many new immigrants from eastern and southern Europe, as they could fill many of the new industrial jobs. It also attracted African Americans as part of the Great Migration out of the rural South to northern cities for work. General Electric and American Locomotive Company (ALCO) were industrial powerhouses, influencing innovation in a variety of fields across the country.

Schenectady is home to WGY, the second commercial radio station in the United States, (after WBZ in Springfield, Massachusetts which was the first station and named for Westinghouse). WGY was named for its owner, General Electric (the G), and the city of Schenectady (the Y). In 1928, General Electric produced the first regular television broadcasts in the United States, when the experimental station W2XB began regular broadcasts on Thursday and Friday afternoons. This television station is now WRGB; for many years it was the Capital District's NBC affiliate. It has been the area's CBS affiliate since 1981.

The city reached its peak of population in 1930. The Great Depression caused a loss of jobs and population in its wake. In the postwar period after World War II, some residents moved to newer housing in suburban locations outside the city. In addition, General Electric established some high-tech facilities in the neighboring town of Niskayuna, which contributed to continuing population growth in the county. In the latter part of the 20th century, Schenectady suffered from the massive industrial and corporate restructuring that affected much of the US, including in the railroads. It lost many jobs and population to other locations, including offshore. Since the late 20th century, it has been shaping a new economy, based in part on renewable energy. Its population increased from 2000 to 2010.

Geography

It is part of the Capital District, the metropolitan area surrounding Albany, the state of New York's capital. Along with Albany and Troy, it is one of the three principal population and industrial centers in the region.

Interstate 890 runs through Schenectady, and the New York State Thruway (Interstate 90) is nearby. Amtrak has a station in Schenectady. The nearest airport is Schenectady County Airport; the nearest commercial airport is Albany International Airport.

ZIP code 12345, which is used by the GE plant in Schenectady, has attracted media attention on account of its simplicity.

Schenectady has a humid continental climate that is hot-summer (Dfa) bordering upon warm-summer (Dfb.) Average monthly temperatures range from 22.9 °F in January to 71.8 °F in July.

Economy

Schenectady was a manufacturing center known as "The City that Lights and Hauls the World"—a reference to two prominent businesses in the city, the Edison Electric Company (now known as General Electric), and the American Locomotive Company (ALCO).

GE retains its steam turbine manufacturing facilities in Schenectady and its Global Research facility in nearby Niskayuna. Thousands of manufacturing jobs have been relocated from Schenectady to the Sun Belt and abroad. Corporate headquarters are now in Boston.

ALCO produced steam locomotives for railroads for years. Later it became renowned for its "Superpower" line of high-pressure locomotives, such as those for the Union Pacific Railroad in the 1930s and 1940s. During World War II, it converted to support the war, making tanks for the US Army. As diesel locomotives began to be manufactured, ALCO joined with GE to develop diesel locomotives to compete with GM's EMD division. But corporate restructuring to cope with the changing locomotive procurement environment led to ALCO's slow downward spiral. Its operations fizzled as it went through acquisitions and restructuring in the late 1960s. Its Schenectady plant closed in 1969.

In the late 20th century, due to industrial restructuring, the city lost many jobs and suffered difficult financial times, as did many former manufacturing cities in upstate New York. The loss of employment caused Schenectady's population to decline by nearly one-third from 1950 into the late 20th century. The early industries had left many sites contaminated with hazardous wastes. Such environmental brownfields have needed technical approaches for redevelopment.

In the 21st century, Schenectady began revitalization. GE established a renewable energy center that brought hundreds of employees to the area. The city is part of a metropolitan area with improving economic health, and a number of buildings have been renovated for new uses.  Numerous small businesses, retail stores and restaurants have developed on State Street downtown.

Price Chopper Supermarkets and the New York Lottery are based in Schenectady.

In December 2014, the state announced that the city was one of three sites selected for development of off-reservation casino gambling, under terms of a 2013 state constitutional amendment. The project would redevelop an ALCO brownfield site in the city along the waterfront, with hotels, housing and a marina in addition to the casino.

In February 2017, the Rivers Casino & Resort opened with 66 table games and 1,150 slot machines on a 50,000-square-foot gambling floor with a steakhouse and a restaurant lounge. The $480 million residential-retail project on 60 acres includes a marina, two hotels, condos, apartments and retail and office space for tech firms.

Demographics

In the census of 2010, there were 66,135 people, 26,265 (2000 data) households, and 14,051 (2000 data) families residing in the city. The population density was 6,096.7 people per square mile (2,199.9/km2). There were 30,272 (2000 data) housing units at an average density of 2,790.6 per square mile (1,077.2/km2). The racial makeup of the city was 59.38% (52.31% Non-Hispanic) (7.07 White-Hispanic) White, 24.19% African American, 14.47% Hispanic or Latin of any race, 8.24% from other races, 5.74% from two or more races, 2.62% Asian American, 0.69%  Native American, and 0.14% Pacific Islander. There is a growing Guyanese population in the area. The top ancestries self-identified by people on the census are Italian (13.6%), Guyanese (12.3%), Irish (12.1%), Puerto Rican (10.1%), German (8.7%), English (6.0%), Polish (5.4%), French (4.4%). These reflect historic and early 20th-century immigration, as well as that since the late 20th century.
  
The Schenectady City School District is very diverse; (71%- 2011)(80%–2013) of district students receive free or reduced lunch. The student population of the school district is majority minority: 35% Black (48% Graduate), 32% White (71% Graduate), 18% Hispanic (51% Graduate), 15% Asian (68% Graduate). As of 2016, the graduation rate for the high school was 56%.

Using 2010 data, there were 28,264 households, out of which 31.2% had children under the age of 18 living with them, 28.0% were married couples living together, 24.7% had a female householder with no husband present, and 45.5% were non-families. 38.6% of all households were made up of individuals, and 10.8% had someone living alone who was 65 years of age or older. The average household size was 2.23 and the average family size was 2.98.

In the city, the year 2010 population was spread out, with 26.3% under the age of 18, 13.6% from 18 to 24, 30.7% from 25 to 44, 21.1% from 45 to 64, and 7.2% who were 65 years of age or older. The median age was 32. For every 100 females, there were 92.5 males. For every 100 females age 18 and over, there were 88.4 males.

The median income for a household in the city in 2000 was $29,378 (2010–$37,436), and the median income for a family was $41,158. Males had a median income of $32,929 versus $26,856 for females. The per capita income for the city was $17,076. About 20.2% of families and 25.9% of the population were below the poverty line, including 41.5% of those under age 18 and 5.6% of those age 65 or over.

Religion 

The largest religious body is the Catholic church, with 44,000 adherents, followed by Islam, with 6,000 followers. The third largest religious body is the Reformed Church in America, with 3,600 members. The fourth is the United Methodist denomination, with 2,800 members.

Notable congregations are the First Presbyterian Church (Schenectady, New York), which is affiliated with the PCA. First Reformed Church RCA is formed in the 17th century, one of the oldest churches in the town. St George's Episcopal Church dates back to 1735; it shared facilities with the Presbyterians for more than 30 years.

Rail transportation

Amtrak, the national passenger rail system, provides regular service to Schenectady, with Schenectady station at 322 Erie Boulevard. Trains include the Ethan Allen, Adirondack, Lake Shore Limited, Maple Leaf, and Empire Service. Schenectady also has freight rail service from Canadian Pacific Railway and Norfolk Southern Railway.

In the early 20th century, Schenectady had an extensive streetcar system that provided both local and interurban passenger service. The Schenectady Railway Co. had local lines and interurban lines serving Albany, Ballston Spa, Saratoga Springs and Troy. There was also a line from Gloversville, Johnstown, Amsterdam, and Scotia into Downtown Schenectady operated by the Fonda, Johnstown, and Gloversville Railroad. The nearly 200 leather and glove companies in the Gloversville region generated considerable traffic for the line. Sales representatives carrying product sample cases began their sales campaigns throughout the rest of the country by taking the interurban to reach Schenectady's New York Central Railroad station, where they connected to trains to New York City, Chicago and points between.

The bright orange FJ&G interurbans were scheduled to meet every daylight New York Central train that stopped at Schenectady. Through the 1900s and into the early 1930s, the line was quite prosperous. In 1932 the FJ&G purchased five lightweight "bullet cars" (#125 through 129) from the J. G. Brill Company. These interurbans represented state-of-the-art design: the "bullet" description referred to the unusual front roof that was designed to slope down to the windshield in an aerodynamically sleek way. FJ&G bought the cars believing that there would be continuing strong passenger business from a prosperous glove and leather industry, as well as legacy tourism traffic to Lake Sacandaga north of Gloversville. Instead, roads were improved, automobiles became cheaper and were purchased more widely, tourists traveled greater distances by car, and the Great Depression decreased business overall.

FJ&G ridership continued to decline and in 1938 the state of New York condemned the line's bridge over the Mohawk River at Schenectady. The bridge had once carried cars, pedestrians, and the interurban, but ice flow damage in 1928 prompted the state to restrict its use to the interurban. When the state condemned the bridge for interurban use, the line abandoned passenger service, and the bullet cars were sold. Freight business had also been important to the FJ&G, and it continued over the risky bridge into Schenectady a few more years.

Places of interest

 Proctors Theatre is an arts center. Built in 1926 as a vaudeville/movie theater, it has been refurbished in the 21st century. It is home to "Goldie," a Wurlitzer theater pipe organ. Proctor's was also the site of one of the first public demonstrations of television, projecting an image from a studio at the GE plant a mile [1.6 km] away. Its 2007 renovation added two theaters: Proctors is home to three theaters, including the historic Mainstage, the GE Theatre, and 440 Upstairs.
 The Stockade Historic District features dozens of Dutch and English Colonial houses from the 18th and 19th centuries. It is the state of New York's first historic district, designated in 1965 by the Department of Interior and named after the historic stockade that originally surrounded the colonial settlement.
 The Schenectady County Historical Society has a History Museum and the Grems-Doolittle research library, both at 32 Washington Avenue in the Stockade District. It has adapted a house originally built in 1895 for the Jackson family. It was used by the GE Women's Club from 1915 until 1957, when it was donated to the Historical Society. The History Museum tells of the history of Schenectady, the Yates Doll House, the Erie Canal, the Glen-Sanders Collection, etc. The research library has many collections of papers, photographs, and books. It welcomes people doing local and genealogical research.
 The General Electric Realty Plot, near Union College, was one of the first planned residential neighborhoods in the U.S. and designed to attract GE executives in the late 19th and early 20th centuries. It features an eclectic collection of grand homes in a variety of architectural styles, including Tudor, Dutch Colonial, Queen Anne, and Spanish Colonial. The Plot is home to the first all-electric home in the United States. It hosts an annual House and Garden Tour.
 Union College, adjacent to the GE Realty Plot, is the oldest planned college campus in the United States. The campus features the unique 16-sided Nott Memorial building, built in 1875, and Jackson's Garden, eight acres (32,000 m2) of formal gardens and woodlands.
 Central Park is the crown jewel of Schenectady's parks. It occupies the highest elevation point in the city. The Common Council voted in 1913 to purchase the land for the present site of the park. The park features an acclaimed rose garden and Iroquois Lake. Its stadium tennis court was the former home to the New York Buzz of the World Team Tennis league (as of 2008). Central Park was named after New York City's Central Park.
 The Schenectady Museum features exhibits on the development of science and technology. It contains the Suits-Bueche Planetarium.
 Schenectady City Hall is the focal point of city government. Designed by McKim, Mead and White, it was built in 1933 during the Great Depression.
 Schenectady's Municipal Golf Course is an 18-hole championship facility sited among oaks and pines. Designed in 1935 by Jim Thompson under the WPA, the course was ranked by Golf Digest among "Best Places to Play in 2004" and received a three-star rating.
 Jay Street, between Proctor's and City Hall, is a short street partially closed to motor traffic. It features a number of small, independently operated businesses and eateries and is a popular destination. Just past the pedestrian section of Jay Street is Schenectady's Little Italy on North Jay Street.
 Schenectady Light Opera Company (SLOC) is a community theater group on Franklin Street in downtown Schenectady.
 The Edison Tech Center exhibits and promotes the physical development of engineering and technology from Schenectady and elsewhere. It provides online and on-site displays that promote learning about electricity and its applications in technology.
 Upper Union Street Business Improvement District, near the Niskayuna boundary, is home to almost 100 independently owned businesses, including a score of restaurants, upscale retail, specialty shops, salons and services.
 Vale Cemetery, listed on the National Register of Historic Places, includes more than 30,000 burials of noted and ordinary residents of the city. It includes the historic African-American Burying Ground, where city residents annually celebrate anniversaries of Juneteenth and Emancipation.

Education
The city is served by the Schenectady City School District, which operates 16 elementary schools, three middle schools and the main high school Schenectady High School. Brown School is a private, nonsectarian kindergarten-through-8th grade school. Catholic schools are administered by the Diocese of Albany.

Wildwood School is a special education, all-ages school.

Schenectady's tertiary educational institutions are Union College, a private liberal arts college, and Schenectady County Community College, a public community college.

Representation in popular culture
Due to its early importance in national history and the economy, Schenectady figured in popular culture.

Fiction
 Author Henry James gave his lead character Daisy Miller, in his 1878 novella of the same name, an origin in Schenectady. 
 Schenectady is referred to or the setting for several of Kurt Vonnegut's books, most notably Hocus Pocus and Player Piano.
 Doctor Octopus, a Marvel Comics supervillain, was born in Schenectady.
 Joseph S. Pulver, Sr.'s Lovecraftian serial killer novel, Nightmare's Disciple (Chaosium, 1999) is set in Schenectady.
 Science fiction writer Isaac Asimov placed the corporate headquarters and factory of U.S. Robots and Mechanical Men, Inc. (fictional 21st century manufacturer of robots) in Schenectady.

 Science fiction writer Harlan Ellison said that anytime a fan or interviewer asked him "Where do you get your ideas?", he would reply "Schenectady". Science fiction writer Barry Longyear subsequently titled a collection of his short stories It Came From Schenectady.

Film and TV

 In Objective, Burma! (1945), Sid Jacobs (William Prince) tells Mark Williams (Henry Hull) about his house on Crane Street in Schenectady. He had taught at Pleasant Valley school before the war.
 In the 1952 Looney Tunes short Fool Coverage, Daffy Duck plays an insurance salesman from the Hotfoot Casualty Underwriters Insurance Company of Schenectady.
 In the 1950s television series, The Honeymooners, Trixie's mother was from Schenectady.
 The Way We Were (1973) was filmed on location at Union College, and in nearby Ballston Spa.
 The 1980s film Heart Like a Wheel is mostly set in Schenectady.
 The 1996 made-for-TV film Unabomber: The True Story starring Robert Hays as David Kaczynski, brother of unabomber Ted Kaczynski, refers to Schenectady, where David and his wife were living when they figured out his brother's involvement in the bombings. 
Star Trek: Enterprise (2001), Starfleet Captain Jonathan Archer is born in Schenectady in 2112.
 The Time Machine (2002), the remake starring Guy Pearce, features Schenectady's Central Park in the ice skating scenes, standing in for New York City's Central Park.
 Synecdoche, New York (2008) is a film partially set in Schenectady, where some scenes were shot. It plays on the aural similarity between the city's name and the figure of speech synecdoche.
 In the ABC-TV series Ugly Betty, Marc St. James (played by Michael Urie) is said to be from Schenectady.
 Winter of Frozen Dreams (2009) was entirely filmed in Schenectady County, but is set in Wisconsin, where the historic events took place. It features the Schenectady, the Town of Rotterdam, and the Village of Scotia, all in New York. The film stars Thora Birch as Barbara Hoffman, the historic Wisconsin murderer,  and Keith Carradine as a detective determined to catch her.
 The Place Beyond the Pines (2013), starring Bradley Cooper and Ryan Gosling, was filmed locally in 2011 near the Schenectady Police Headquarters and other areas of Schenectady.
 In the NBC sitcom Will & Grace, Schenectady is the hometown of character Grace Adler (played by Debra Messing).

Music
 The music video for the song "Hero" by Mariah Carey was filmed at Proctors Theatre in Schenectady.
 The song "Someone to Love" by Fountains of Wayne, refers to fictional character Seth Shapiro moving from Schenectady in 1993 to Brooklyn.
 The song "Join the Circus", the last major number in Cy Coleman's musical Barnum, mentions the city in its lyric.

Notable people

 Stephen Alexander (1806–1883), astronomer, mathematician, and educator
 Horatio Allen (1802–1889), railroad engineer and inventor
 Ralph Alpher (1921–2007), cosmologist, won National Medal of Science for seminal work on Big Bang Theory
 Chester Arthur (1829–1886), U.S. president, lived in Schenectady while attending Union College
 Kumar Barve (born 1958), Majority Leader and first Indian-American legislator in the Maryland House of Delegates
Suzanne Basso, murderer
 Katharine Burr Blodgett (1898 – 1979), physicist, chemist, and first woman awarded PhD in physics from University of Cambridge
 Andy Bloom (born 1973), Olympic shotputter
 Jim Barbieri (born 1941), MLB outfielder who played for Schenectady's 1954 Little League World Series championship team
 Maria Brink (born 1977), lead singer of band In This Moment, was born in Schenectady
 Pat Cadigan (born 1953), science fiction author, was born in Schenectady
 Greg Capullo (born 1962), comic book artist, was born in Schenectady
 Bruce W. Carter (1950-1969), USMC, Medal of Honor Recipient, was born in Schenectady
 Jimmy Carter (born 1924), U.S. president, studied briefly at Union College
 Billy Connors (1941–2018), MLB pitcher, coach and executive who played for Schenectady's 1954 Little League World Series championship team
 Jackie Craven, architectural writer
 Dexter Curtis (1828–1898), Wisconsin State Assemblyman, was born in Schenectady
 Mary Daly (1928–2010), feminist theologian
 Ann B. Davis (1926–2014), actress (Schultzy on The Bob Cummings Show and Alice Nelson on The Brady Bunch), was born in Schenectady
 Antonio Delgado (born 1977), Lieutenant Governor of New York, and former U.S. representative
 Amir Derakh (born 1963), guitarist for rock band Orgy, was born in Schenectady
 Paul "Legs" DiCocco (1924–1989), gambler and racketeer
 John Owen Dominis (1832–1891), prince consort of Queen Liliuokalani of Hawaii
 Jamie Dukes (born 1964), football player, born in Schenectady
 Harry J. Flynn (1933–2019), Roman Catholic archbishop of Minneapolis and St. Paul, was born in Schenectady
 Henry Glen (1739–1814), Continental army officer, U.S. representative 
 Harold Gould (1923–2010), actor (The Golden Girls, The Sting), was born in Schenectady
 Harold J. Greene (1959–2014), United States Army general
 Kevin Greene (1962-2020), football linebacker, coach
 Joseph E. Grosberg  (1883–1970), pioneer in supermarket and wholesale foods industries
 John E. Hart (1824–1863), Union Navy officer
 Keith Hitchins (1931–2020), American historian
 Gilbert Hyatt (ca. 1761–1823), loyalist, founder of Sherbrooke, Quebec
 Fred Isabella (1917–2007), dentist, businessman, and politician
 Patricia Kalember (born 1957), actress, born in Schenectady
 Steve Katz (born 1945), guitarist (Blood, Sweat & Tears)
 Barry Kramer (born 1942), basketball player, jurist
 Irving Langmuir (1881–1957), 1932 Nobel laureate in chemistry
 Wayne LaPierre (born 1949), CEO of the National Rifle Association of America
 Arnold Lobel (1933–1987), author and illustrator of children's books, was born in Los Angeles and raised in Schenectady
 George R. Lunn, (1873–1948), mayor, U.S. representative, lieutenant governor
 Ranald MacDougall (1915–1973), screenwriter and director
 Sir Charles Mackerras (1925–2010), Australian conductor, was born in Schenectady.
 John Van Antwerp MacMurray (1881–1960), U.S. China expert
 Donald Martiny (born 1953), artist
 Tom Moulton (born 1940), record producer
 Shirley Muldowney (born 1940), auto racer in International Motorsports Hall of Fame, born and raised in Schenectady
 Mordecai Myers (1776–1871), mayor of Schenectady
 Ray Nelson (born 1931), science-fiction author and cartoonist, born in Schenectady
 Sterling Newberry, inventor, worked at General Electric in Schenectady
 Eliphalet Nott (1773–1866), president of Union College
 David Opdyke (born 1969), visual artist
 John Palasik (1954-2022), Vermont state legislator, born in Schenectady
 Jean-Hervé Peron (born 1949), Germany rock musician, lived in Schenectady in 1967–1968 as exchange student
 Jacob Van Vechten Platto (1822–1898), Wisconsin state assemblyman
 Joseph S. Pulver (1955-2020), novelist, poet, editor, born in Schenectady
 Pat Riley (born 1945), NBA player, executive and Hall of Fame coach, was born in Rome, NY, lived in Schenectady
 Don Rittner, author and historian, lived in Schenectady
 Ron Rivest (born 1947), cryptographer, co-inventor of RSA cryptography
 Lewis K. Rockefeler (1875–1948), U.S. representative, born in Schenectady
 Al Romano (born 1954), football player
 Margaret Rotundo (born 1949), Maine legislator
 Mickey Rourke (born 1952), Academy Award-nominated actor, born in Schenectady
 R. Tom Sawyer (1901–1986), engineer, writer and inventor of the first successful gas turbine locomotive, born in Schenectady
 John Sayles (born 1950), film director and Academy Award-nominated screenwriter, born and raised in Schenectady
 Vincent J. Schaefer (1906–1993), chemist, meteorologist
 Amalie Schoppe (1791–1858), German writer
 Michael H. Schill (born 1958), president of the University of Oregon
 Ben Schwartz (born 1981), actor, (Jean-Ralphio Saperstein on Parks and Recreation), graduated from Union College in 2003
 William H. Seward (1801–1872), Abolitionist Republican Governor of New York, U.S. Senator, U.S. Secretary of State during and after the Civil War
 Nehemiah Shumway (1761–1843), teacher and musical composer, lived in Schenectady
 Kenneth Schermerhorn (1929–2005), conductor of Nashville Symphony, born in Schenectady
 Simon J. Schermerhorn (1827–1901), U.S. Representative
Lawrence W. Sherman (born 1949), experimental criminologist and police educator
 Gerald Stano (1951–1998), serial killer
 Charles Proteus Steinmetz (1865–1923), mathematician, electrical engineer, developer of alternating current
 Brian U. Stratton (born 1957), mayor, director of the New York State Canal Corporation
 Samuel S. Stratton (1916–1990), mayor, U.S. representative, father of Brian Stratton
 John Sykes (born 1955), co-founder of MTV: Music Television, Chairman of The Rock & Roll Hall of Fame, raised in Schenectady 
 Frank Taberski (1889–1941), billiards champion; born in Schenectady
 Lynne Talley (born 1954), oceanographer, born in Schenectady
 Marybeth Tinning (born 1942), serial killer
 John Tudor (born 1954), MLB pitcher
 Deborah Van Valkenburgh (born 1952), actress (The Warriors), was born in Schenectady
 Kurt Vonnegut (1922–2007), author, lived in Schenectady while working for GE in the early 1950s
 Lee Wallard (1910–1963), race car driver
 George H. Wells (1833–1905), Confederate officer, attorney and member of the Louisiana State Senate
 Casper Wells (born 1984), MLB outfielder
 George Westinghouse (1846–1914), engineer and inventor, grew up in Schenectady
 Andrew Yang (born 1975), entrepreneur, 2020 Democratic presidential candidate, 2021 New York City mayor candidate
 Charles Yates (1808–1870), Union Army brigadier general during the American Civil War; nephew of Joseph Christopher Yates
 Joseph Christopher Yates (1768–1837), governor of New York
 Clifton Young (1917–1951), actor

References

Further reading
 The Fonda, Johnstown, and Gloversville RR: The Sacandaga Route to the Adirondacks. Randy Decker, Arcadia Publishing.
 Our Railroad: The Fonda, Johnstown, and Gloversville RR 1867 to 1893.  Paul Larner, St. Albans, VT.
 The Steam Locomotive in America. Alfred W. Bruce, 1952, Bonanza Books division of Crown Publishers, Inc.,  New York, NY.
 
Yates, Austin A. Schenectady County, New York: Its History to the Close of the Nineteenth Century, New York: New York History Company, 1902, full scanned text online at Allen Public Library, at Internet Archive.

External links

 City of Schenectady (official website)
 Schenectady County Chamber of Commerce

 
1661 establishments in North America
1661 establishments in the Dutch Empire
Cities in New York (state)
Cities in Schenectady County, New York
County seats in New York (state)
Establishments in New Netherland
New York State Heritage Areas
Populated places established in 1661
Populated places on the Mohawk River
Populated places on the Underground Railroad
Capital District (New York)
New York placenames of Native American origin